Mouhamadou Habib Diarra (born 3 January 2004) is a professional footballer who plays as a midfielder for Strasbourg. Born in Senegal, he is a youth international for France.

Club career
A youth product of Mulhouse and Strasbourg, Diarra signed his first professional contract with Strasbourg on 18 August 2021. He made his professional debut with Strasbourg in a 5–1 Ligue 1 win over Saint-Étienne on 17 October 2021.

International career
Born in Senegal, Diarra moved to France a young age. He is a youth international for France, having represented the France U16s and U18s.

References

External links
 
 FFF Profile

2004 births
Living people
People from Dakar Region
French footballers
France youth international footballers
Senegalese footballers
Senegalese emigrants to France
French sportspeople of Senegalese descent
Association football midfielders
RC Strasbourg Alsace players
Ligue 1 players
Championnat National 3 players